Hilary Gong (born 10 October 1998) is a Nigerian professional footballer who plays as winger for Armenian club Ararat-Armenia.

Club career

AS Trenčín
Gong made his professional debut for AS Trenčín against Ružomberok on 22 April 2017.

Vitesse
On 5 July 2018, Gong joined Dutch side Vitesse Arnhem on a four-year deal for an undisclosed fee.

Career statistics

References

External links
 AS Trenčín official club profile 
 
 Futbalnet Profile 
 
 

1998 births
Living people
Nigerian footballers
Nigerian expatriate footballers
Association football forwards
AS Trenčín players
SBV Vitesse players
FK Haugesund players
FC Ararat-Armenia players
Slovak Super Liga players
Eredivisie players
Eliteserien players
Armenian Premier League players
Expatriate footballers in Slovakia
Expatriate footballers in the Netherlands
Expatriate footballers in Norway
Expatriate footballers in Armenia
Nigerian expatriate sportspeople in Slovakia
Nigerian expatriate sportspeople in the Netherlands
Nigerian expatriate sportspeople in Norway
Nigerian expatriate sportspeople in Armenia